Engineer Abdul Rahim was appointed the Afghan Communications Minister of the Afghan Interim Administration—the first post-Taliban government in 2002.
Abdul Rahim was from the Tajik ethnic group.

He was replaced by Masoom Stanakzai from the Pashtun ethnic group when President Hamid Karzai appointed the Cabinet of the Afghan Transitional Administration.

Early life 

Eng. Abdul Rahim Sayedjan was born in Darwaz district of northeastern Badakshan Province. He is of Tajik descent, born to a farming family in Badakhshan. His early years were spent in Kabul where he was sent to finish his schooling and pursue higher education. He was among the first members of his village to have attained a university education.

He completed his education at a local technical institute and received his bachelor's degree in civil engineering from the Polytechnic University in Kabul. Soon after, he worked as an engineer at the Ministry of Water and Energy.

Rahim is married, and has three sons and two daughters. His eldest son, Shoaib Rahim, is currently the acting Mayor of Kabul.

Political career 

Rahim served as a representative of Jamiat-i-Islami in Pakistan, primarily involved in efforts of providing humanitarian, educational, and political relief for Afghan refugees as a result of the Soviet Invasion of Afghanistan.  He extensively participated delegations across Europe to garner international support for the Afghan resistance to the Soviet Invasion. From 1993 to 1995, he was the Chargé d'Affaires of Afghanistan in Washington and New York, coordinating American assistance to Afghanistan. Upon the completion of this service, Rahim was assigned as Chargé d'Affaires of Afghanistan in Islamabad, Pakistan until 1996.

During the Taliban rule of Kabul, Rahim was appointed as the Chargé d'Affaires in Beijing, China for over a year and then moved to become Chargé d'Affaires in Dushanbe, Tajikistan to be closer to the affairs of Afghanistan until 1997. Due to strong involvement with and to better assist over a million refugees in Iran, Rahim was appointed as the Afghanistan's Consul General in Mashhad, Iran from 1997 until 2001. During his mission the prime focus was towards assisting the immigrant with basic necessity and secondary educational opportunity of the refuges.

Modern Afghanistan

Transitional government 

Under the Afghan Interim Administration, the first post-Taliban government in 2016, Rahim was part of the three-member Jamiat-i-Islami's delegation to the Second Bonn Meeting and appointed as the Afghanistan Minister of Communication and Post. During his leadership in the Ministry, Rahim focused on uniform phone charges, and ensuring compliance to regulation by private telephone companies.

Most notably, he led the ministry to support the launch of Afghan Wireless Communications, a joint venture between the government and Afghan-American businessman Ehsan Bayat. This was lauded as a critical step in redevelopment of Afghanistan's infrastructure, connecting Afghanistan to the world as well as providing jobs within the country.

Interim Minister of Refugees and Repatriation 

Rahim was nominated for the post of Minister of Refugees and Repatriations by President Hamid Karzai after the 2015 elections. However, he did not receive enough votes in the parliamentary approval proceedings to secure the position. He worked as the acting minister, bringing attention to the plight of both internally displaced persons and treatment of Afghan refugees in neighboring countries and the west.

Diplomatic missions 

After the dissolution of the interim government, Rahim served as the Ambassador of Afghanistan to Indonesia from 2018 to 2019.

He served as Ambassador and Representative of Afghanistan to the Organisation of Islamic Cooperation (OIC) in Jeddah, Saudi Arabia from 2017 to 2018.

References

Afghan engineers
Communication ministers of Afghanistan
Living people
Afghan expatriates in Pakistan
Afghan Tajik people
Year of birth missing (living people)